Gremiphyca is a lobed, non-mineralized alga with a pseudoparenchymatous thallus, dating to the Ediacaran period. The genus was reinvestigated by Xiao et al. and was interpreted to be a stem-group florideophyte.

References

Fossil algae
Ediacaran life